Election for the Indian state of Jammu and Kashmir were held on 23 March 1987. Farooq Abdullah was reappointed as the Chief Minister.

The election is widely perceived to have been rigged. The rigging of the election is believed to have led to the insurgency in Jammu and Kashmir. After the following elections to the Parliament in 1989, which saw low turn-out, Governor's Rule was declared in Jammu and Kashmir in 1990, which lasted till 1996.

The 1987 election was a watershed in the politics of the Jammu and Kashmir state.

Background

The background of the 1987 election is fraught with multiple complexities.

During the long years of imprisonment of Sheikh Abdullah, his loyalists split off from the National Conference party and formed a Plebiscite Front. The remaining members of the National Conference merged their party with the Indian National Congress.

After Abdullah's release and his accord with Indira Gandhi, the Congress party accepted him as its own Head and elected him as the State's Chief Minister. However, during the 1977 election, Abdullah shunned the Congress party and revived a new National Conference party from the erstwhile Plebiscite Front. He won the election handsomely.

After Sheikh Abdullah's death, the Congress party again sought an alliance with the National Conference for the 1983 election. It was again shunned and the new leader Farooq Abdullah won the election independently. Congress however emerged as the de facto party of the Jammu region. Congress exploited the internal squabbles in the National Conference and teamed up with Farooq's brother-in-law G. M. Shah to topple Farooq's government. This led to a period of instability during which the Governor's Rule was imposed.

After Rajiv Gandhi became the leader of the Indian National Congress, another accord was reached with Farooq Abdullah. The Governor's Rule was lifted and Farooq returned to power in 1986, but with the understanding that Congress and the National Conference would ally for the 1987 election. In the view of scholar Sten Widmalm, the State's two largest parties had formed an 'election cartel', which had the result that popular discontent could not be channelled.

Before the election, various anti-establishment groups including Jamaat-e-Islami joined hands to form a Muslim United Front (MUF) mainly pointing out that the NC had capitulated before the Centre for the sake of power and bartered away the special status of the State. Efforts were made to arouse Muslim sentiments along communal lines. MUF's election manifesto stressed the need for a solution to all outstanding issues according to Simla Agreement, work for Islamic unity and against political interference from the centre. Their slogan was wanting the law of the Quran in the Assembly.

The NC-Congress(I) combine contested all the 76 seats and the MUF, 43 seats.

Voting
The election was held on 23 March 1987. Nearly 75 percent of the voters participated, the highest recorded participation in the state. Nearly eighty percent of the people in the Valley voted.

Elections for Bhadrawah, Leh and Kargil were held in June 1987.

Results

The NC-Congress alliance won 66 seats in the Assembly: NC winning 40 seats of the 45 it contested, and Congress winning 26 out of 31 (5 out of 6 contested seats in the Valley). The alliance received only 53% of the popular vote but garnered 87% of the seats.

The BJP won 2 seats, in Jammu. The MUF expected to win 10 seats out of the 44 seats it contested. But it won only 4 seats, even though it had polled 31% votes.
Syed Ali Shah Geelani of Jamaat-e-Islami (a constituent of MUF) won from Sopore.

The disparity between the popular vote and the seat wins was very high. (In comparison, in 1983, the NC and Congress polled 78% of the vote to achieve 95% of the seats.) Scholar Sten Widmalm explains the increased disparity as an effect of forming an "election cartel" (between the NC and Congress), which had a dominant effect in the first-past-the-post election system used in India. The cartel's victory seemed unfair to many Jammu and Kashmir voters, which was magnified when allegations of fraud came to the surface.

The MUF's garnering of 31% of the vote in its first electoral contest has been described as a 'huge' success. 
Journalist Balraj Puri states that the MUF emerged as the main alternative to the NC-Congress alliance in all parts of the Valley, except the four constituencies of the Kupwara district where People's Conference came in the second place.

The People's Conference did not win a seat despite having been expected to do well in the constituencies of Bandipora, Sangrama, Handwara, and Kupwara. They still managed to capture 93,949 votes.

Elected members

Electoral malpractice
India Today reported that "starting about two weeks before the election, 600 opposition workers were arrested in areas where the MUF, independents, and PC [People's Conference] candidates were showing strength".

In the Amira Kadal constituency of Srinagar, MUF's Syed Mohammed Yusuf Shah was a candidate. As the vote-counting began, it was becoming clear that Yusuf Shah was winning by a landslide. His opponent, Ghulam Mohiuddin Shah, went home dejected. But he was summoned back by the electoral officials and declared the winner. When the crowds protested, the police arrived and arrested Yusuf Shah and his supporters. They were held in custody till the end of 1987.

Leader of the People's Conference party, Abdul Ghani Lone, complained that vote counting in the constituency of Handwara was tampered with by the deputy inspector-general of police, A.M. Watali. There were several cases like this with other candidates but the petitions to the courts did not lead to any action. There was no response from the central government, courts, or the election commission to the demands that the allegations of rigging be investigated. Kashmir's High Court chose not to probe the allegations and the Election Commission was inactive at the time.

Balraj Puri has noted three constituencies where the MUF lost narrowly: Bijbehara, Wachi, and Shopian. The number of rejected votes in these constituencies was far higher than the margin of victory for the alliance, indicating that the vote-counting could have been easily manipulated.

Whereas it took only three hours to count the votes in Farooq Abdullah's seat, the vote-counting in seats where the MUF had influence took considerably longer. In Anantnag, it was reported that the results were delayed for two and a half days while the polling station was surrounded by hundreds of policemen. In Bijbehara the polling officers refused to count when they found that a MUF candidate had taken an early lead. In Doru, an NC candidate with a lead of 300 votes was declared the winner even though more than a thousand votes remained to be counted. Counting in the Pulwama constituency took no account of the strategic Tahab belt. Counting in Shopian and Sopore went on for three days.

BBC cited a Kashmiri politician Khem Lata Wakhloo, as stating that there was widespread rigging in Kashmir. She stated: "I remember that there was massive rigging in 1987 elections. The losing candidates were declared winners. It shook the ordinary people's faith in the elections and the democratic process."

Governor Jagmohan is reported to have been appalled at what was being done, but he said that he was ordered by the central government in Delhi not to interfere.

Many see this rigged election as a cause of militancy in Kashmir. Abdul Ghani Lone became a separatist leader after the 1987 election and stated that many young people, out of frustration with the democratic process, decided to go for an armed struggle.

Extent of electoral malpractice
The extent of election malpractice has been debated by scholars and analysts.

Scholar Victoria Schofield has stated that the MUF might have won four more seats if there was no electoral fraud. On the other hand, an anonymous source in the Intelligence Bureau has advanced the estimate that the MUF may have lost approximately 13 seats due to electoral malpractice. Other journalists and commentators have estimated a loss of fifteen to twenty seats. Farooq Abdullah conceded that the opposition parties might have been able to win 20 seats instead of 10 in the absence of rigging. He denied his own involvement in the rigging.

Former Kashmir civil servant Wajahat Habibullah states that clear indications of malpractice were found in ten constituencies. These constituencies were mainly in Srinagar and all of them were counted as wins of the National Conference. He believes that Farooq Abdullah allowed them to be rigged to gain a majority for the National Conference in the Assembly so that it would not be dependent on support from the Indian National Congress. He also notes that the methods of rigging appeared "blatant" and lacked the finesse of the pre-1977 elections.

Aftermath
Farooq Abdullah was elected Chief Minister and formed a coalition government. However, the Government lacked legitimacy in the eyes of the people in the Valley. Rebels branded the election as a "thoroughly made one". The Valley sank into a "morass of frustration and radicalisation", states scholar Sumantra Bose. In June 1988, there were protests against a hike in the electricity tariffs, resulting in police firings. In July, the Jammu and Kashmir Liberation Front launched its first bomb attack in Srinagar. A cycle of violence and protests took hold, steadily rising in tempo. In January 1990, the Union Government appointed Jagmohan as the governor of the state. Farooq Abdullah resigned in protest, and Governor's Rule was declared.

See also
 Insurgency in Jammu and Kashmir
 Kashmir conflict

Notes

References

Bibliography
 
 
 
 
 
 
 
 
 
 
 

Jammu and Kashmir
1987
1987
Electoral fraud in India